Bombus confusus is a species of bumblebee found in Austria, Belgium, the Czech Republic, France, Germany, Hungary, Lithuania, Poland, Romania, Slovakia, Slovenia, Spain, and Switzerland.

Appearance 
The functional morphology of Bombus confusus has been investigated (as well as others), and found that the males have enlarged eyes and a frontal zone with enlarged facets. This can be associated with improved spatial resolution and contrast sensitivity, all of which connect to the mating of the males.

Reproduction
Visual search for females was thought to be the only observed pre-mating behavior in Bombus confusus. Studies confirm that alongside visual search, labial gland secretion is also used to attract females.

References

Bumblebees
Insects described in 1859
Hymenoptera of Europe